The GMC-4 is the only 4-bit microcomputer to be mass-produced in the last 30 years (as of 2009). It was produced by Gakken, a Japanese publisher who distributed it with a magazine attached to a box containing the components required to assemble the computer.

The purpose of the GMC-4 is education. It provides an accessible way to learn about assembly language and the principles of computing.

References

External links

Description of the kit, assembly language and example programs

Example programs
gmc4cc (C Compiler for GMC-4)
G4CBASIC

Microcomputers
Single-board computers